KMP Holdings (acronym for "Korean Music Power") (Hangul: KMP홀딩스) was a South Korean music distribution company. It was headquartered in Gangnam-gu, Seoul and was opened on March 18, 2010.

History
In March 2010, KMP Holdings was established via a joint venture between S.M., YG, JYP, Star Empire, and other companies like Media Line, CAN Entertainment and Music Factory Entertainment. KMP is the official distributor of releases from these companies (KMP stands for Korean Music Power). Its chief executive officer is songwriter-producer Kim Chang-whan, representative of Media Line.

KMP Holdings encompasses many fields including: music service, digital music distribution, and TV program production. It is a service platform that works to provide a more reasonable digital music system. Many believe this is held to challenge the duopoly on music distribution by Mnet Media and LOEN Entertainment.

KT Music, the music contents arm of KT Corporation,  eventually acquired KMP in November 2012, and in mid-June 2013, it absorbed KMP's distribution network.

Awards
On the 2nd Gaon Chart K-Pop Awards last February 2, 2013, KMP Holdings was awarded as the "Best Music Distribution Company (Offline Music)".

Founding companies
 S.M. Entertainment
 YG Entertainment
 JYP Entertainment
 Star Empire Entertainment
 Media Line
 CAN Entertainment
 Music Factory Entertainment

Business area
 Music Album Off-Line Distribution
 Digital Music Distribution (domestic, foreign)
 Investment for Music Contents
 Contents Producing & Management 
 Concert & Awards
 New Media, Social Media Business
 Merchandising

Former distribution network

Korean
 Afrodino World
 CAN Entertainment (formerly CAN&J Entertainment)
 Fair Music
 GM Contents Media (later merged into Core Contents Media)
 GraceJ
 iMBC (for Infinite Challenge releases)
 JYP Entertainment
 Media Line
 Music Factory Entertainment
 S.M. Entertainment
 Star Empire Entertainment (excluding Nine Muses, whose distribution rights were then handled by LOEN Entertainment)
 Trophy Entertainment (moved to LOEN Entertainment, then dissolved)
 YG Entertainment

Japanese
 Avex Group
 Johnny & Associates

References

External links 
  (via Tistory) 

Genie Music
Defunct record labels of South Korea
Record labels established in 2010
Record labels disestablished in 2012
Record label distributors